Stefano Lambri (active 1620s) was an Italian painter of histories and portraits. He trained with the painter Giovanni Battista Trotti. He painted in 1628, for the Dominican Church of Cremona, a picture representing St. William and St. Louis Bertrand.

References

17th-century Italian painters
Italian male painters
Painters from Cremona
Year of death unknown
Year of birth unknown